Oller is a common surname in the Catalan language. Variants are Ollé and Olle. Notable people with the surname include:

 Adam Oller (born 1994), American baseball player
 Denisse Oller (born 1955), Puerto Rican-born broadcaster and journalist
 Fidela Oller (1869–1936), Spanish Roman Catholic nun
 Francisco Oller (1833-1917), Puerto Rican Impressionist painter
 María Teresa Oller (1920-2018), Spanish Valencian composer and folklorist
 Narcís Oller (1846–1930), Spanish Catalan author
 Joseph Oller (1839-1922), Catalan-born French bookmaker, betting innovator and entertainment entrepreneur
 Rico Oller (born 1958), U.S. politician

See also
 Ullr

Catalan-language surnames